The 1922 Army Cadets football team represented the United States Military Academy in the 1922 college football season. In their eighth season under head coach Charles Dudley Daly, the Cadets compiled a  record, shut out seven of their ten opponents, and outscored all opponents by a combined total of 228 to 27, an average of 22.8 points scored and 2.7 points allowed.  In the annual Army–Navy Game, the Cadets defeated the Midshipmen  
 
Two Army players were recognized as first-team players on the All-America team: guard Fritz Breidster and center Edgar Garbisch.  Garbisch was later inducted into the College Football Hall of Fame.

Schedule

Players
Army's first-string players started only six games, against the Springfield YMCA, Kansas, Auburn, Yale, Notre Dame, and Navy. The following individuals were starters in at least two of those six games.
 Fritz Breidster - started 5 games at left guard, 1 game at right guard
 Francis Dodd - started 3 games at right halfback
 August W. Farwick - started 1 game at right tackle, 1 game at left guard, 4 games at right guard
 Edgar Garbisch - started 5 games at center
 Sanford J. Goodman - started 2 games at left tackle, 4 games at right tackle
 Charles W. Lawrence - started 1 game at right halfback, 1 game at left halfback
 Dennis J. Mulligan - started 1 game at right tackle, 4 games at left tackle
 Charles T. Myers - started 3 games at left end, 2 games at right end 
 George Winfered Smythe - started 6 games at quarterback
 Patrick W. Timberlake - started 5 games at left halfback
 Washington M. Ives - started 2 game at right halfback
 Walter C. White - started 2 games at left end, 3 games at right end
 William H. Wood - started 6 games at fullback

References

Army
Army Black Knights football seasons
College football undefeated seasons
Army Cadets football